The Zona pellucida-like domain (ZP domain / ZP-like domain / ZP module) is a large protein region of about 260 amino acids. It has been recognised in a variety of receptor-like eukaryotic glycoproteins.  All of these molecules are mosaic proteins with a large extracellular region composed of various domains, often followed by either a transmembrane region and a very short cytoplasmic region or by a GPI-anchor.

Functional and crystallographic studies revealed that the "ZP domain" region common to all these proteins is a protein polymerization module that consists of two distinct but structurally related immunoglobulin-like domains, ZP-N and ZP-C. The ZP module is located in the C-terminal portion of the extracellular region and – with the exception of non-polymeric family member ENG – contains 8 or 10 conserved Cys residues involved in disulfide bonds.

The first 3D structure of a ZP module protein filament, native human uromodulin (UMOD), was determined by cryo-EM.

Additional copies of isolated ZP-N domains are found in the N-terminal region of egg coat protein subunits involved in fertilization in both vertebrates and invertebrates, such as human zona pellucida components ZP1, ZP2 and ZP4 and mollusk vitelline envelope receptor for egg lysin (VERL).

Examples 

Humans genes encoding proteins containing this domain include:

 CUZD1
 DMBT1
 ENG
 GP2
 OIT3
 POMZP3
 TECTA, TECTB, TGFBR3
 UMOD, UMODL1
 ZP1, ZP2, ZP3, ZP4, ZPLD1

References

Protein domains
Protein families
Single-pass transmembrane proteins